The 1972 winners of the Torneo di Viareggio (in English, the Viareggio Tournament, officially the Viareggio Cup World Football Tournament Coppa Carnevale), the annual youth football tournament held in Viareggio, Tuscany, are listed below.

Format
The 16 teams are organized in knockout rounds. The round of 16 are played in two-legs, while the rest of the rounds are single tie.

Participating teams
Italian teams

  Atalanta
  Fiorentina
  Inter Milan
  Lazio
  Milan
  Napoli
  Roma
  Torino

European teams

  Újpest Dózsa
  Dukla Praha
  Partizan Beograd
  Lausanne
  Standard Liège
  Benfica
  Crystal Palace

American teams
  Boca Juniors

Tournament fixtures

Champions

Footnotes

External links
 Official Site (Italian)
 Results on RSSSF.com

1972
1971–72 in Italian football
1971–72 in Yugoslav football
1971–72 in Belgian football
1971–72 in Czechoslovak football
1971–72 in Portuguese football
1971–72 in English football
1971–72 in Swiss football
1971–72 in Hungarian football
1972 in Argentine football